Nozipho Phillistasia Funaziphi Mavuso is a South African politician who has represented the African National Congress (ANC) in the KwaZulu-Natal Provincial Legislature since 2019. She was elected to the provincial legislature in the 2019 general election, ranked 45th on the ANC's provincial party list. She also stood as a candidate in the 2014 general election but on that occasion was ranked 71st on the ANC's party list and did not secure election to a seat. She was formerly the Deputy Regional Secretary of the ANC's Abaqulusi branch.

References

External links 
 
 Hon. NPF Mavuso at KwaZulu-Natal Provincial Legislature

Living people
Year of birth missing (living people)
Members of the KwaZulu-Natal Legislature
African National Congress politicians
21st-century South African politicians